The Burma Road was a road linking Burma (now known as Myanmar) with southwest China. Its terminals were Lashio, Burma, in the south and Kunming, China, the capital of Yunnan province in the north. It was built in 1937-1938 while Burma was a British colony to convey supplies to China during the Second Sino-Japanese War. Preventing the flow of supplies on the road helped motivate the occupation of Burma by the Empire of Japan in 1942 during World War II. Use of the road was restored to the Allies in 1945 after the completion of the Ledo Road.  Some parts of the old road are still visible today.

History
The sections from Kunming to the Burmese border were built by 200,000 Burmese and Chinese laborers during the Second Sino-Japanese War in 1937 and completed by 1938 in order to circumvent the Japanese blockade of China. The construction project was coordinated by Chih-Ping Chen.

During World War II, the Allies used the Burma Road to transport materiel to aid China's war effort, especially after China lost sea-access following the loss of Nanning in the Battle of South Guangxi. Supplies from San Francisco for example would land at Rangoon (now Yangon), moved by rail to Lashio where the road started in Burma, up steep gradients before crossing into China over the Wanding bridge. The Chinese stretch of the road continued for some five hundred miles through rural Yunnan terrain before ending up in Kunming.

In July 1940, Britain yielded to Japanese diplomatic pressure and  closed the Burma Road for three months. The Japanese overran Burma in 1942, closing the Burma Road. The Allies thereafter supplied China by air, flying "over The Hump" from India, which initially proved fatally dangerous and woefully inadequate, leading U.S. army general Joseph Stilwell to obsessively pursue the goal of reopening the Burma Road.

The Allies recaptured northern Burma in late 1944, which allowed the Ledo Road from Ledo, Assam to connect to the old Burma Road at Wanding, Yunnan province. The first trucks reached the Chinese frontier by this route on January 28, 1945.

Films set on the Burma Road
 Burma Convoy (1941)
 A Yank on the Burma Road (1942)
 Bombs over Burma (1942)
 Objective, Burma! (1945)

Further reading 
 C. T. Chang: Burma Road, Malaysia Publications, Singapore 1964.
 Forbes, Andrew ; Henley, David (2011). China's Ancient Tea Horse Road. Chiang Mai: Cognoscenti Books. 
 Jon Latimer: Burma:The Forgotten War. John Murray, London 2004, .
 Donovan Webster: The Burma Road: The Epic Story of the China-Burma-India Theater in World War II. Farrar Straus & Giroux, New York, 2003, .
 Smith, Nicol (1940). Burma Road: The Story of the World's Most Romantic Highway. New York: The Bobbs-Merrill Company.
Tan, Pei-Ying. The Building of the Burma Road. Whittlesey house, 1945.

See also

Ledo Road
Tea Horse Road, ancient Silk Road segment over the same area
Hangrui Expressway, the modern road along this route
Yunnan-Burma Railway
Burma Road (Israel), wartime makeshift named for the original Burma Road

References

External links

Merrill's Marauders: Protecting The Burma Road
Burma Road photos
WW2 - Campaigns in Burma World War II Burma Road video
WWII - Why We Fight - The Battle of China 1943 video 1
WWII - Why We Fight - The Battle of China 1943 video 2
Life-line to China Re-Opened, 1945/02/12 (1945) Universal Newsreel
The Ghost Road Mark Jenkins, Outside (magazine), October 2003
Blood, Sweat and Toil along the Burma Road Donovan Webster, National Geographic Magazine, November 2003
China to Europe via a new Burma road David Fullbrook, Asia Times, September 23, 2004
On the way to MandalayThe Sydney Morning Herald, August 16, 2008
Los Angeles Times, "Burma's Stilwell Road: A backbreaking WWII project is revived", December 30, 2008.
 Transcribed copies of Joseph Warren Stilwell's World War II diaries  are available on the Hoover Institution Archives website, with the original diaries among the Joseph Warren Stilwell papers at the Hoover Institution Archives.
 Transcribed copies of the World War II diaries of Ernest F. Easterbrook, Stilwell's executive assistant in Burma (as of 1944) and son-in-law, are available on the Hoover Institution Archives website, with the original diaries among the Ernest Fred Easterbrook papers at the Hoover Institution Archives.
 For tours along the Burma Road.

World War II sites in Burma
Roads in Myanmar
Roads in China
Second Sino-Japanese War
Military history of China during World War II
South-East Asian theatre of World War II
World War II operations and battles of the Southeast Asia Theatre
World War II sites in China
China–Myanmar relations
Logistics routes of World War II